Mohamad Afa Al Rifai (born 6 April 1988 in Syria) is a Syrian football player who is currently playing for Al-Turra in Jordan.

References

External links 
Player profile at goal.com

1988 births
Association football goalkeepers
Living people
Syrian footballers
Syria international footballers
Syrian expatriate footballers
Syrian expatriate sportspeople in Jordan
Syrian Premier League players